Henti was a Hittite queen, the wife of King Suppiluliuma I. She assumed her role as Tawananna after the King's mother Daduhepa died. Henti bore five sons to Suppiluliuma: Arnuwanda II,  Telipinu, Piyassili, Mursili II, and Zannanza.  Two of her sons succeeded to the throne, Arnuwanda and Mursili II.

She is often called the 'disappearing Queen' as she vanished shortly before Suppiluliuma's diplomatically beneficial marriage to the Babylonian Princess Mal-Nikal (Malnigal), who succeeded her as Queen and Tawananna. A common theory for the reason of her disappearance is that Henti was banished in order for her husband to secure an alliance with Babylonia's King Burna-Buriash II.

This is not unlikely as Suppiluliuma is famed for having overthrown his brother Tudhaliya III (the Younger) for the throne.

In fiction, Queen Henti is also a character in the historical fiction manga Red River.

References

.

Hittite queens